Jonathan Mitchell Petrus (May 11, 1987 – July 18, 2019) was an American football guard.

Early years
Mitch Petrus was born on May 11, 1987 in Carlisle, Arkansas. He attended Carlisle High School, where he played high school football. He was a class of 2005 Graduate.

College career
An unrated tight end prospect, Petrus walked on as a fullback at the University of Arkansas but was moved to offensive guard for the 2007 season. He blocked for rushing tandem Darren McFadden and Felix Jones, both of whom eclipsed the 1,000-yard mark, and was named to the All-SEC second-team. He redshirted during the 2008 season. Following the 2009 season, he was named All-SEC first-team by SEC coaches and second-team by the Associated Press.

He graduated with a degree in agricultural economics.

Professional career

New York Giants

He was drafted by the New York Giants in the fifth round of the 2010 NFL Draft. He was the seventh guard to be selected that year. He played in 17 regular-season games with three starts. In the 2011 season, the Giants finished with a 9–7 record and made the playoffs. He appeared in all four 2011 postseason games, including the Super Bowl XLVI victory over the New England Patriots.

Petrus was waived on September 2, 2012 after the Giants were awarded offensive tackle D. J. Jones on waivers from the Philadelphia Eagles. Jones failed his physical with the Giants and Petrus was re-signed the next day.

On November 3, Petrus was released by the Giants after tight end Travis Beckum was activated.

New England Patriots
The New England Patriots signed Petrus on November 13, 2012 to help with a depleted offensive line that included injuries to Logan Mankins and Dan Connolly. He was released by the Patriots on December 3, 2012.

Tennessee Titans
On December 6, 2012, Petrus was claimed off waivers by the Titans. He played in two games with the Titans in the 2012 season. He was waived by the Titans on March 12, 2013.

After his stint with the Titans, Petrus did not sign with another NFL team.

Personal life
Petrus played bass guitar in a band called Vikings of the North Atlantic.

He resided and worked in Carlisle, Arkansas, where he died of heat stroke on July 18, 2019.

References

External links

New York Giants bio
Arkansas Razorbacks bio

1987 births
2019 deaths
People from Lonoke County, Arkansas
Players of American football from Arkansas
American football offensive guards
Arkansas Razorbacks football players
New York Giants players
New England Patriots players
Tennessee Titans players
Deaths from hyperthermia